Juan Bautista Bairoletto or J.B. Vairoletto (November 11, 1894 – September 14, 1941), was an Argentine outlaw born in Santa Fe province, the son of Italian immigrants. Bailoretto fled  from justice after killing a sheriff because of "lover matters" with a prostitute in Castex, a little town in La Pampa Province. This bandit was called the "Argentine Robin Hood" or El Robin Hood criollo ("The Creole Robin Hood") and became a myth in Argentina after his death. He was shot and killed on September 14, 1941 amid a police ambush at his home in General Alvear, Mendoza, where he had settled some years before.

In popular culture

The 1985 film La Aventura de un rebelde describes his life as outlaw. Argentinian musician Leon Gieco composed a song Bandidos Rurales about Bairoletto and others Argentinian rural bandits.

References

1894 births
1941 deaths
Argentine culture
Argentine outlaws
Argentine murderers
Deaths by firearm in Argentina
People shot dead by law enforcement officers